Queen's Wharf may refer to:
Queens Wharf, Auckland, New Zealand
Queen's Wharf, Brisbane, Australia
Queen's Wharf, Toronto, Canada
Queen's Wharf Lighthouse, Toronto, Canada
Queens Wharf, Newcastle, Australia